Tai Lam Wu is a village in Sai Kung District, Hong Kong.

Administration
Tai Lam Wu, including Ngau Liu, is a recognized village under the New Territories Small House Policy.

History
Tai Lam Wu was part of the inter-village grouping, the Ho Chung Tung or Ho Chung Seven Villages, which had its centre in Ho Chung.

At the time of the 1911 census, the population of Ngau Liu was 14. The number of males was 5.

References

External links

 Delineation of area of existing village Tai Lam Wu (Sai Kung) for election of resident representative (2019 to 2022)

Villages in Sai Kung District, Hong Kong